Pennsylvania State Senate District 34 includes parts of Cumberland County and Dauphin County and all of Perry County. It is currently represented by Republican Greg Rothman.

District profile
The district includes the following areas:

Cumberland County

Dauphin County

All of Perry County

Senators

References

Pennsylvania Senate districts
Government of Centre County, Pennsylvania
Government of Huntingdon County, Pennsylvania
Government of Juniata County, Pennsylvania
Government of Mifflin County, Pennsylvania